Rezaul Haque Chowdhury is a Bangladesh Awami League politician and the incumbent Member of Parliament from Kushtia-1.

Early life
Saeed was born on 16 April 1954. He completed his education up to H.S.C. or grade 12.

Career
Chowdhury was elected to Parliament on 5 January 2014 from Kushtia-1 as a Bangladesh Awami League candidate.

References

Further reading
 

Awami League politicians
Living people
1954 births
10th Jatiya Sangsad members